Yasumi is both a masculine Japanese given name and a Japanese surname.

Possible writings
Yasumi can be written using different combinations of kanji characters. Here are some examples: 

靖巳, "peaceful, sign of the snake (Chinese zodiac)"
靖三, "peaceful, three"
靖実, "peaceful, fruit/reality"
康巳, "healthy, sign of the snake (Chinese zodiac)"
康三, "healthy, three"
康実, "healthy, fruit/reality"
安巳, "tranquil, sign of the snake (Chinese zodiac)"
安三, "tranquil, three"
保巳, "preserve, sign of the snake (Chinese zodiac)"
保三, "preserve, three"
保実, "preserve, fruit/reality"
泰巳, "peaceful, sign of the snake (Chinese zodiac)"
泰三, "peaceful, three"
易巳, "divination, sign of the snake (Chinese zodiac)"

The name can also be written in hiragana やすみ or katakana ヤスミ.

Notable people with the given name Yasumi
Yasumi Hara (原 保美, 1915–1997), Japanese actor
, Japanese writer
, Japanese video game designer

Notable people with the surname Yasumi
Kohei Yasumi (八隅 孝平, born 1978), Japanese mixed martial artist
, Japanese samurai
, real name: Rieko Yasumi (休 理英子), Japanese senryu poet and writer
Tom Yasumi (トム・ヤスミ, born 1966), Japanese animation director
, Japanese water polo player

Japanese-language surnames
Japanese masculine given names